Wrightia angustifolia is a species of plant in the family Apocynaceae. It is endemic to Sri Lanka. Found in Shrubland.

References

 http://www.botanicgardens.gov.lk/herbarium/index.php?option=com_sobi2&catid=1838&Itemid=90
 http://plants.jstor.org/specimen/g00190788?history=true
 http://legacy.tropicos.org/Name/1804318

angustifolia
Flora of Sri Lanka